Zhou Liao (born 2 February 1989) is a Chinese footballer who currently plays as a striker.

Club career
Zhou was deemed as a high potential player when he was in Wuhan youth team system. In 2006, he was invited to a one-month trial at Premier League side Bolton Wanderers with his teammate Yang Changpeng. Zhou started his professional career with Wuhan Optics Valley in 2007. On 17 April, he made his senior debut and scored the winning goal in a Chinese Super League match which Wuhan beat Shandong Luneng Taishan 3–2. In October 2008, Wuhan Optics Valley withdrew from the top tier for what it claimed was unfair punishment by the Chinese Football Association. He joined Hubei Greenery which used the Wuhan U-19 team as well as Hubei youth team as the foundation for the squad in 2009 and made an impression within the team as Hubei Greenery won promotion to China League One in 2009 season. Zhou refused to extend his contract in 2011 when Hubei Greenery was purchased and renamed as Hubei Wuhan Zhongbo. He was linked with Super League club Shandong Luneng, Tianjin Teda and Henan Construction in the summer of 2011. However, Zhou eventually decided to stay in Hubei and extend his contract for half year.

Zhou made a free transfer to Tianjin Teda in November 2011. On 20 March 2012, he made his debut for Tianjin Teda in a 2012 AFC Champions League group stage match which Tianjin draw with K League side Seongnam Ilhwa Chunma 1–1.
On 25 February 2016, Zhou was loaned to China League One club Wuhan Zall until 31 December 2016.

On 23 June 2017, Zhou moved to China League Two side Yinchuan Helanshan on a half season loan deal.

On 8 August 2020, he signed with Wuhan Three Towns. In his first season with the club he would go on to aid them in winning the division title and promotion into the second tier. This would be followed by another division title win and promotion as the club entered the top tier for the first tine in their history.

Career statistics 
Statistics accurate as of match played 31 January 2023.

Honours

Club
Wuhan Three Towns
China League One: 2021
China League Two: 2020

References

External links
 

1989 births
Living people
Chinese footballers
Footballers from Wuhan
Wuhan Guanggu players
Tianjin Jinmen Tiger F.C. players
Wuhan F.C. players
Chinese Super League players
China League One players
Association football forwards